Cold Front is a 1989 Canadian-American crime-thriller film directed  by Allan A. Goldstein and starring Martin Sheen, Michael Ontkean and Beverly D'Angelo.

Plot 
The RCMP, the CIA, and the KGB are all in pursuit of a free-lance hit man who kills randomly-selected women, in addition to the targets he's been paid to kill.

CIA agent John Hyde (Martin Sheen) and his Canadian Mountie counterpart, Derek McKenzie (Michael Ontkean), investigate the murder of a Korean embassy employee, and end up in the middle of this jurisdictional nightmare, as does Hyde's ex-wife Amanda O'Rourke (Beverly D'Angelo), who is the assassin's next target.

Cast

References

External links 

1989 thriller films
1980s crime thriller films
English-language Canadian films
Canadian crime thriller films
American crime thriller films
Films directed by Allan A. Goldstein
Films shot in Vancouver
Films set in Vancouver
1980s English-language films
1980s American films
1980s Canadian films